Mike Brito (August 21, 1934 – July 7, 2022) was a Cuban-American baseball scout. He was a scout for the Los Angeles Dodgers for nearly 45 years. He signed Fernando Valenzuela.  Brito was easily recognizable on Dodger home game telecasts by standing immediately behind home plate, wearing a white Panama hat and holding a radar gun.

References

1934 births
2022 deaths
American people of Cuban descent
Los Angeles Dodgers scouts